Christine D'haen (25 October 1923 – 3 September 2009) was a Flemish author and poet. She was born in Sint-Amandsberg and died at Bruges.

D'haen studied Germanic philology at the University of Ghent and continued her studies in Amsterdam and Edinburgh. She settled in Bruges and became a teacher at high school. She made an inventory of the handwritings of Guido Gezelle while working at the Gezelle archive. She wrote a biography of Guido Gezelle and also translated work of Hugo Claus into English.

In 1958 her first book of poetry, Gedichten 1946-1958 (Poems 1946-1958), was published.

Bibliography
 Gedichten 1946-1958 (1958)
 Vanwaar zal ik u lof toezingen? (1966)
 Gezelle, Poems/Gedichten (1971)
 Ick sluit van daegh een ring (1975)
 Onyx (1983)
 De wonde in 't hert (1988)
 Mirages (1989)
 Zwarte sneeuw (1989)
 Duizend-en-drie (1992)
 Een brokaten brief (1992)
 Merencolie (1992)
 Morgane (1995)
 Een paal, een steen (1996)
 De zoon van de Zon (1997)
 Bérénice (1998)
 Dodecaëder/Dantis meditatio (1998)
 Het geheim dat ik draag (1998)
 Kalkmarkt 6, De stad en Het begin (1999)
 Het huwelijk (novel, 2000)

Awards
 1951 - Arkprijs van het Vrije Woord
 1991 - Anna Bijnsprijs of the Dutch literature
 1992 - Prijs der Nederlandse Letteren

See also

 Flemish literature

References
 Christine D'haen biodata
 P.G. Buckinx, Jaarb. Kon. Acad. v. Nederl. Taal- en Letterk. (1976)
 P. Claes, Kritisch lexicon van de Nederlandstalige literatuur na 1945 (1980)

1923 births
2009 deaths
Flemish poets
Writers from Bruges
Writers from Ghent
Prijs der Nederlandse Letteren winners
Ark Prize of the Free Word winners
Alumni of the University of Edinburgh
Flemish women writers
20th-century Belgian poets
20th-century Belgian women writers